"South Hamgyeong Province" (Hamgyeongnam-do) is, according to South Korean law, a province of the Republic of Korea, as the South Korean government formally claims to be the legitimate government of the whole of Korea. The area constituting the province is under the de facto jurisdiction of North Korea and China.

As South Korea does not recognize changes in administrative divisions made by North Korea, official maps of the South Korean government shows South Hamgyeong Province in its pre-1945 borders. The area corresponds to North Korea's South Hamgyong Province, as well as parts of Ryanggang Province, Chagang Province, Kangwon Province and China's Jilin Province.

To symbolize its claims, the South Korean government established The Committee for the Five Northern Korean Provinces as an administrative body for the five northern provinces. A governor for South Hamgyeong Province is appointed by the President of South Korea.

Administrative divisions 
Hamgyeongbuk-do is divided into 3 cities (si) and 16 counties (gun).

City 
 Hamheung (hangul: 함흥, hanja: 咸興)
 78 dong
 Heungnam (흥남, 興南)
 75 dong
 Wonsan (원산, 元山)
 88 dong

County 
 Hamju (함주, 咸州) (administrative center at Hamheung)
 16 myeon : Gigok, Deoksan, Dongcheon, Sampyeong, Sanggicheon, Sangjoyang, Seondeok, Yeonpo, Jubuk, Juseo, Juji, Cheonseo, Cheonwon, Toejo, Hagicheon, Hajoyang
 Sinheung (신흥, 新興)
 8 myeon : Sinheung, Gapyeong, Sangwoncheon, Seogocheon, Yeonggo, Wonpyeong, Hawoncheon, Dongsang
 Jeongpyeong (정평, 定平)
 8 myeon : Chongpyong, Gosan, Gwangdeok, Gwirim, Munsan, Sinsang, Jangwon, Jui
 Yeongheung (영흥, 永興)
 1 eup : Yeongheung
 11 myeon : Goryeong, Deokheung, Seonheung, Sunryeong, Eokgi, Yodeok, Inheung, Jangheung, Jinpyeong, Hodo, Heongcheon
 Gowon (고원, 高原)
 1 eup : Gowon
 5 myeon : Gunnae, Sangok, Sangsan, Sudong, Ungok
 Muncheon (문천, 文川) (administrative center at Muncheon-myeon)
 1 eup : Cheonnae
 7 myeon : Muncheon, Deokwon, Myeonggu, Bukseong, Unrim, Pungsang, Pungha
 Anbyeon (안변, 安邊)
 7 myeon : Anbyeon, Ando, Seokwangsa, Baehwa, Seogok, Singosan, Sinmo
 Hongwon (홍원, 洪原)
 1 eup : Hongwon
 6 myeon : Gyeongwun, Bohyeon, Samho, Yongwon, Yongpo, Unhak
 Bukcheong (북청, 北靑)
 3 eup : Bukcheong, Sinpo, Sinchang
 11 myeon : Gahoe, Geosan, Deokseong, Sanggeoseo, Seongdae, Sokhu, Sin-Bukcheong, Yanghwa, Igok, Hageoseo, Huchang
 Iwon (이원, 利原) (administrative center at Iwon-myeon)
 1 eup : Chaho
 3 myeon : Iwon, Dong, Namsong
 Dancheon (단천, 端川)
 1 eup : Dancheon
 8 myeon : Gwangcheon, Damduil, Bokgwi, Bukdoil, Suha, Sinman, Ijung, Hada
 Jangjin (장진, 長津)
 7 myeon : Jangjin, Dongmun, Dongha, Buk, Sangnam, Seohan, Jungnam
 Pungsan (풍산, 豐山)
 5 myeon : Pungsan, Ansan, Ansu, Ungyi, Cheonnam
 Samsu (삼수, 三水)
 7 myeon : Samsu, Geumsu, Gwanheung, Samseo, Sinpa, Jaseo, Hoin
 Gapsan (갑산, 甲山)
 5 myeon : Gapsan, Dongin, Jindong, Sannam, Hoerin
 Hyesan (혜산, 惠山)
 1 eup : Hyesan
 5 myeon : Daejin, Byeoldong, Bocheon, Bongdu, Unheung

Several parts of Hyesan County (Heaven Lake) are under the rule of PRC. Another parts of same county are claimed by ROC.

See also 
 The Committee for the Five Northern Korean Provinces
 South Hamgyong Province of the Democratic People's Republic of Korea (North Korea)
 Hamgyong, historical Eight Provinces of Korea

Provinces of South Korea
States and territories established in 1949